Thiolases, also known as acetyl-coenzyme A acetyltransferases (ACAT),  are enzymes which convert two units of acetyl-CoA to acetoacetyl CoA in the mevalonate pathway.

Thiolases are ubiquitous enzymes that have key roles in many vital biochemical pathways, including the beta oxidation pathway of fatty acid degradation and various biosynthetic pathways. Members of the thiolase family can be divided into two broad categories: degradative thiolases (EC 2.3.1.16) and biosynthetic thiolases (EC 2.3.1.9). These two different types of thiolase are found both in eukaryotes and in prokaryotes: acetoacetyl-CoA thiolase (EC:2.3.1.9) and 3-ketoacyl-CoA thiolase (EC:2.3.1.16). 3-ketoacyl-CoA thiolase (also called thiolase I) has a broad chain-length specificity for its substrates and is involved in degradative pathways such as fatty acid beta-oxidation. Acetoacetyl-CoA thiolase (also called thiolase II) is specific for the thiolysis of acetoacetyl-CoA and involved in biosynthetic pathways such as beta-hydroxybutyric acid synthesis or steroid biogenesis.

The formation of a carbon–carbon bond is a key step in the biosynthetic pathways by which fatty acids and polyketide are made. The thiolase superfamily enzymes catalyse the carbon–carbon-bond formation via a thioester-dependent Claisen condensation reaction mechanism.

Function 

Thiolases are a family of evolutionarily related enzymes. Two different types of thiolase are found both in eukaryotes and in prokaryotes: acetoacetyl-CoA thiolase and 3-ketoacyl-CoA thiolase. 3-ketoacyl-CoA thiolase (also called thiolase I) has a broad chain-length specificity for its substrates and is involved in degradative pathways such as fatty acid beta-oxidation. Acetoacetyl-CoA thiolase (also called thiolase II) is specific for the thiolysis of acetoacetyl-CoA and involved in biosynthetic pathways such as poly beta-hydroxybutyrate synthesis or steroid biogenesis.

In eukaryotes, there are two forms of 3-ketoacyl-CoA thiolase: one located in the mitochondrion and the other in peroxisomes.

There are two conserved cysteine residues important for thiolase activity. The first located in the N-terminal section of the enzymes are involved in the formation of an acyl-enzyme intermediate; the second located at the C-terminal extremity is the active site base involved in deprotonation in the condensation reaction.

Isozymes 

Mammalian nonspecific lipid-transfer protein (nsL-TP) (also known as sterol carrier protein 2) is a protein which seems to exist in two different forms: a 14 Kd protein (SCP-2) and a larger 58 Kd protein (SCP-x). The former is found in the cytoplasm or the mitochondria and is involved in lipid transport; the latter is found in peroxisomes. The C-terminal part of SCP-x is identical to SCP-2 while the N-terminal portion is evolutionary related to thiolases.

Mechanism 

Thioesters are more reactive than oxygen esters and are common intermediates in fatty-acid metabolism. These thioesters are made by conjugating the fatty acid with the free SH group of the pantetheine moiety of either coenzyme A (CoA) or acyl carrier protein (ACP).

All thiolases, whether they are biosynthetic or degradative in vivo, preferentially catalyze the degradation of 3-ketoacyl-CoA to form acetyl-CoA and a shortened acyl-CoA species, but are also capable of catalyzing the reverse Claisen condensation reaction (reflecting the negative Gibbs energy change of the degradation, which is independent of the thiolase catalyzing the reaction). It is well established from studies on the biosynthetic thiolase from Z. ramigera that the thiolase reaction occurs in two steps and follows ping-pong kinetics. In the first step of both the degradative and biosynthetic reactions, the nucleophilic Cys89 (or its equivalent) attacks the acyl-CoA (or 3-ketoacyl-CoA) substrate, leading to the formation of a covalent acyl-enzyme intermediate. In the second step, the addition of CoA (in the degradative reaction) or acetyl-CoA (in the biosynthetic reaction) to the acyl–enzyme intermediate triggers the release of the product from the enzyme. Each of the tetrahedral reaction intermediates that occur during transfer of an acetyl group to and from the nucleophilic cysteine, respectively, have been observed  in X-ray crystal structures of biosynthetic thiolase from A. fumigatus.

Structure 

Most enzymes of the thiolase superfamily are dimers. However, monomers have not been observed. Tetramers are observed only in the thiolase subfamily and, in these cases, the dimers have dimerized to become tetramers. The crystal structure of the tetrameric biosynthetic thiolase from Zoogloea ramigera has been determined at 2.0 Å resolution. The structure contains a striking and novel ‘cage-like’ tetramerization motif, which allows for some hinge motion of the two tight dimers with respect to each other. The enzyme tetramer is acetylated at Cys89 and has a CoA molecule bound in each of its
active-site pockets.

Biological function 

In eukaryotic cells, especially in mammalian cells, thiolases exhibit diversity in intracellular localization related to their metabolic functions as well as in substrate specificity. For example, they contribute to fatty-acid β-oxidation in peroxisomes and mitochondria, ketone body metabolism in mitochondria, and the early steps of mevalonate pathway in peroxisomes and cytoplasm. In addition to biochemical investigations, analyses of genetic disorders have made clear the basis of their functions. Genetic studies have also started to disclose the physiological functions of thiolases in the yeast Saccharomyces cerevisiae. Thiolase is of central importance in key enzymatic pathways such as fatty-acid, steroid and polyketide synthesis. The detailed understanding of its structural biology is of great medical relevance, for example, for a better understanding of the diseases caused by genetic deficiencies of these enzymes and for the development of new antibiotics.  Harnessing the complicated catalytic versatility of the polyketide synthases for the synthesis of biologically and medically relevant natural products is also an important future perspective of the studies of the enzymes of this superfamily.

Disease relevance 

Mitochondrial acetoacetyl-CoA thiolase deficiency, known earlier as β-ketothiolase deficiency, is an inborn error of metabolism involving isoleucine catabolism and ketone body metabolism. The major clinical manifestations of this disorder are intermittent ketoacidosis but the long-term clinical consequences, apparently benign, are not well documented. Mitochondrial acetoacetyl-CoA thiolase deficiency is easily diagnosed by urinary organic acid analysis and can be confirmed by enzymatic analysis of cultured skin fibroblasts or blood leukocytes.

β-Ketothiolase Deficiency has a variable presentation. Most affected patients present between 5 and 24 months of age with symptoms of severe ketoacidosis. Symptoms can be initiated by a dietary protein load, infection or fever. Symptoms progress from vomiting to dehydration and ketoacidosis. Neutropenia and thrombocytopenia may be present, as can moderate hyperammonemia. Blood glucose is typically normal, but can be low or high in acute episodes. Developmental delay may occur, even before the first acute episode, and bilateral striatal necrosis of the basal ganglia has been seen on brain MRI.

References

External links
 
 
 

Protein domains